John Frederick Rowell (31 December 1918 – 3 March 1988) was an English professional footballer who appeared in the Football League for Wrexham, Bournemouth & Boscombe Athletic and Aldershot as a right back. He played in the 1937 FA Charity Shield for Sunderland.

Career statistics

References 

English footballers
English Football League players
Brentford F.C. players
1918 births
1988 deaths
Sportspeople from Seaham
Footballers from County Durham
Association football fullbacks
Sunderland A.F.C. players
AFC Bournemouth players
Wrexham A.F.C. players
Aldershot F.C. players